Saktigarh  is a  Kolkata Suburban Railway junction station on the Howrah–Bardhaman main line and Howrah–Bardhaman chord. It is located in Purba Bardhaman district in the Indian state of West Bengal.  It serves Saktigarh and surrounding areas.

History
The first passenger train in eastern India ran from Howrah to Hooghly on 15 August 1854. The track was extended to Raniganj by 1855.

The Howrah–Bardhaman chord, a shorter link to Bardhaman from Howrah than the Howrah–Bardhaman main line, was constructed in 1917.

Electrification
Electrification of Howrah–Burdwan main line was completed with 25 kV AC overhead system in 1958. Howrah–Bardhaman chord was electrified in 1964–66.

References

External links
Trains from Howrah
Trains to Howrah

Railway stations in Purba Bardhaman district
Howrah railway division
Kolkata Suburban Railway stations